PGSC may stand for:
Persian Gulf Service Command
Persian Gulf Studies Center
Supreme Court of Papua New Guinea
Platinum Girl Scout Cookies (Cannabis Cultivar)
Punta Gorda Sailing Club
Pushpa Gujral Science City, Kapurthala